In cooking and gastronomy, duck or duckling is the meat of several species of bird in the family Anatidae, found in both fresh and salt water. Duck is eaten in many cuisines around the world.  It is a high-fat, high-protein meat rich in iron. Duckling nominally comes from a juvenile animal, but may be simply a menu name.

One species of freshwater duck, the mallard, has been domesticated and is a common livestock bird in a variety cultures.  The Pekin duck is another livestock breed of importance, particularly in North America.  Magret refers specifically to the breast of a mulard or Muscovy (or Barbary) duck that has been force fed to produce foie gras.

Duck meat 

Duck is particularly predominant in the Chinese cuisine—a popular dish is Peking duck, which is made from the Pekin duck. Duck meat is commonly eaten with scallions, cucumbers and hoisin sauce wrapped in a small spring pancake made of flour and water or a soft, risen bun known as gua bao. In Cantonese cuisine, the roasted duck or siu aap is produced by Siu mei BBQ shops; siu app is offered whole or in halves, and commonly as part of take-out with steamed white rice and vegetables. Siu app can also be served as part of the barbecue platter appetizer (the first of a ten-course Chinese banquet meal) in combination with char siu (roasted pork), soy sauce chicken, yu chu (roasted suckling pig) or siu yuk (roasted pig belly), and jellyfish).

Duck meat is also a part of Indian cuisine, especially important in Northeast India, such as in the Assamese cuisine. The old Assamese text, Kamarupa Yatra discusses duck meat, squab and tortoise meat. Popular dishes include duck with white gourd, duck with laixak and duck with bamboo shoot. Duck meat and squab are also cooked with banana blossom. It is popular among both the tribal and non-tribal populations.

The Pekin duck is also the most common duck meat consumed in the United States, and according to the USDA, nearly 26 million ducks were eaten in the U.S. in 2004. Because most commercially raised Pekins come from Long Island, New York, Pekins are also sometimes called "Long Island" ducks, despite being of Chinese origin. Some specialty breeds have become more popular in recent years, notably the Muscovy duck, and the mulard duck (a sterile hybrid of Pekins and Muscovies). Unlike most other domesticated ducks, Muscovy ducks are not descended from mallards.

Duck egg

Nutrition 

Duck meat is very high in cholesterol and fat, particularly saturated fat.  It is also very high in protein and iron.

Duck dishes 

Duck is used in a variety of dishes around the world, most of which involve roasting for at least part of the cooking process to aid in crisping the skin. Some dishes use parts of the duck as an ingredient along with other ingredients. Notable duck dishes include:

 Ballotine
 Balut is a developing bird embryo boiled and eaten from the shell. It is sold as street-food in the Philippines and around Southeast Asia.
 Bebek Betutu – a famous traditional dish from Bali, Indonesia. The duck is first seasoned with pungent roots and various herbs, wrapped with banana leaves, and roasted. Chicken is also used to prepare Betutu.
 Chicken and duck blood soup
 Duck blood and vermicelli soup
 Duck confit – duck legs that have been cured (partly or fully) in salt, then marinated and poached in duck fat, typically with garlic and other herbs. The French word confit means "preserved", and the French name for duck confit is "confit de canard".
 Czernina – a sweet and sour Polish soup made of duck blood and clear poultry broth. It was once considered a symbol of Polish culture until the 19th century, customarily served to young men and is even featured as a plot device in a famous epic poem called Pan Tadeusz.
 Duck à l'orange – a classic French dish in which the duck is roasted and served with an orange sauce.
 Duck rice – A traditional Singaporean dish made of braised or roast duck and white rice
 Duck Bamboo Curry – a traditional dish of Sylhet region
 Foie gras – a specially fattened and rich liver, or a pâté made from the liver, sometimes taken from a goose but usually from a duck.
 Long Island roast duckling – this is a whole roasted bird, sometimes brined previously. When done properly, most of the fat melts off during the cooking process, leaving a crispy skin and well-done meat. Some restaurants on Long Island serve this dish with a cherry sauce.
 Guyanese duck curry
 Kamo Nanban – soba or udon with duck meat and leeks
 Lemon duck
 Nanjing Salted Duck
 Oritang – a variety of guk, Korean soup made with duck and various vegetables.
 Peking duck – a famous Chinese dish originating from Beijing, prepared since the Ming Dynasty era. It is prized for the thin, crispy skin, with authentic versions of the dish serving mostly the skin and little meat, and eaten with pancakes, scallions, and hoisin sauce or sweet bean sauce.
 Pressed duck – a complex dish originally from Rouen, France.
 Rouennaise sauce – prepared using puréed duck liver as an ingredient
 Tiết canh
 Turducken: an American dish that comprises a turkey, stuffed with a duck, which is in turn stuffed with a chicken.
 Wuhan duck
 Yuhwang ori
 Zhangcha duck – a quintessential dish of Sichuan cuisine. It is first prepared by smoking a marinated duck over tea leaves and twigs of the camphor plant, then steamed, and finally deep fried for a crisp finish. Also called tea-smoked duck.

Pollution contaminating wild duck 

Ducks caught in the wild may be contaminated from pollution of rivers and other bodies of water, because they eat fish and other aquatic life. In particular, PCBs may pose a health risk for those who eat wild duck frequently.

References

Further reading 
 Rombauer, Irma S., et al. Joy of Cooking, Scribner, 1997. .

External links 

 Domestic duck types
 Domestic duck nutrition values

 
Poultry products
Chinese cuisine
Vietnamese cuisine
German cuisine
Italian cuisine
French cuisine
Poultry